Lars Christian Dahll (5 November 1823 – 29 November 1908) was a Norwegian military officer and politician.

He chaired Centralforeningen for Udbredelse af Legemsøvelser og Vaabenbrug from 1878 to 1881. On 3 April 1884, he was made Minister of the Army in the short-lived cabinet of Christian Homann Schweigaard, who had to resign on 26 June the same year.

References

 

1823 births
1908 deaths
Norwegian Army personnel
Norwegian sports executives and administrators
Government ministers of Norway
19th-century Norwegian people
Defence ministers of Norway